{{Automatic_taxobox
| image = Neotelphusa sequax.jpg
| image_caption = Neotelphusa sequax| taxon = Neotelphusa
| authority = Janse, 1958
| display_parents = 3
}}Neotelphusa''' is a genus of moths in the family Gelechiidae.

Species
 Neotelphusa anisogrisea Janse, 1958
 Neotelphusa bimaculata Janse, 1958
 Neotelphusa castrigera (Meyrick, 1913)
 Neotelphusa cirrhomacula Janse, 1958
 Neotelphusa cisti (Stainton, 1869)
 Neotelphusa craterota (Meyrick, 1913)
 Neotelphusa ferrugilinea Janse, 1958
 Neotelphusa flavinotata Janse, 1958
 Neotelphusa huemeri (Nel, 1998)
 Neotelphusa fuscisparsa Janse, 1958
 Neotelphusa limenaea (Meyrick, 1920)
 Neotelphusa melicentra (Meyrick, 1921)
 Neotelphusa obliquifascia Janse, 1960
 Neotelphusa ochlerodes (Meyrick, 1926)
 Neotelphusa ochrophthalma (Meyrick, 1927)
 Neotelphusa pallidistola Janse, 1958
 Neotelphusa phaeomacula Janse, 1958
 Neotelphusa praefixa (Braun, 1921)
 Neotelphusa querciella (Chambers, 1872)
 Neotelphusa sequax (Haworth, 1828)
 Neotelphusa similella Janse, 1958
 Neotelphusa tapinota Janse, 1958
 Neotelphusa traugotti'' (Huemer & Karsholt, 2001)

References

 
Litini
Moth genera